Philippe Étancelin (28 December 1896 – 13 October 1981) was a French Grand Prix motor racing driver who joined the new Formula One circuit at its inception.

Biography
Born in Rouen, Seine-Maritime, in Normandy, he worked as a merchant in the winter and raced cars during the summer.

His wife, Suzanne, served as his crew chief. Their three children were placed in a school in Rouen while she traveled with her husband to races around the world. She communicated with Étancelin through French sign language as he raced around the speedway. Suzanne told a reporter Étancelin bought a racing car to celebrate the birth of their second child, Jeanne Alice. He did not intend to race the car but merely use it for pleasure driving around the countryside. After two years of recreational motoring, Étancelin decided to enter a race.

He began racing a privateer Bugatti in 1926, entering local events and hillclimbs. His first victory was the Grand Prix de la Marne at Reims in 1927, the same year he recorded a third at the Coppa Florio in Saint-Brieuc. He repeated his victory at Reims in 1929, ahead of Zenelli and friend Marcel Lehoux, making a Bugatti sweep of the podium. Étancelin took a victory at the Grand Prix de la Baule and the Antibes Prix de Conseil General.

Nicknamed "Phi Phi", Étancelin also earned Bugatti a win at the 1930 Algerian Grand Prix, followed home by Lehoux. At the Formula Libre French Grand Prix, he defeated Henry Birkin's Bentley, and won the Grenoble Circuit de Dauphine, with a third at Lyons.

He began the 1931 season in a Bugatti, placing behind Czaykowski at the Casablanca Grand Prix at Anfa. He won the Circuit d'Esterel Plage at Saint-Raphaël. For major events, run to Formula Libre rules to a 10-hour duration, he shared with Lehoux. They dropped out of both the Italian and French Grands Prix. After Étancelin switched to Alfa later in the year, he came fourth in the Marne Grand Prix and won the four-hour Dieppe Grand Prix, ahead of Czaykowski's Bugatti and Earl Howe's Delage. He added wins at Grenoble and the Comminges Grand Prix at St. Gaudens.

While Étancelin was a top privateer, he was consistently beaten by works teams in 1932, earning only one win, the Picardy Grand Prix at Peronne.

In 1933, Étancelin's Alfa narrowly lost the 19th annual French Grand Prix (organized by the French Automobile Club at the Montlhery Autodrome near Paris) following a "furious" contest with Giuseppe Campari's Maserati, losing the lead on the final lap of the  event. Nevertheless, Étancelin won a second consecutive Picardy Grand Prix, over a "formidable" Raymond Sommer, and placed second to an equally formidable Tazio Nuvolari at the Nîmes Grand Prix, with win over Jean-Pierre Wimille at the Marne Grand Prix.

The new 750 kilogram formula brought the conquering Silver Arrows of Mercedes and Auto Union. Étancelin switched to a Maserati 8CM, earning second places at Casablanca, Montreux, and Nice, with a win at Dieppe. He shared an Alfa with Luigi Chinetti to win Le Mans.

Étancelin's 1935 season was no better, with only a third at Tunis. He gave Rudolf Caracciola's Mercedes a tough fight at Monaco in the little 3.7 litre Maserati, but suffered brake fade and came fourth. Driving a Maserati for the Subalpina team, he also had a spectacular accident at the Swiss Grand Prix in Bern, with his car upturned and in flames, but he did not suffer injuries.

Entering one of the new 4.4 liter Maseratis in 1936, he was outmatched by the German entrants, suffering retirements in nearly every contest. He won only the Pau Grand Prix, and that was "against modest opposition". He negotiated the 100 laps in 3 hours 21 minutes 22 seconds. In October, Étancelin qualified 6th for the Vanderbilt Cup, which was run over  near Westbury, New York, after a  qualifier at Roosevelt Raceway in Long Island. By this time he had won the Marne Grand Prix three times.

He stayed out of racing in 1937, returning in 1938 solely to share a new Talbot with Chinetti at LeMans, but did not score a win. For 1939, he put his Talbot third at Pau, following Hermann Lang and Manfred von Brauchitsch home. He also scored a fourth place at the French Grand Prix.

Étancelin would enter the first motor race held in France postwar, failing to finish at the Bois de Boulogne in an Alfa. He was not able to obtain one of the scarce new racers until 1948, when he purchased a 4½ litre Talbot, and put it second at the Albi Grand Prix, behind Luigi Villoresi in the Maserati.

His 1949 season saw second places at the Marseilles Grand Prix (to Fangio), the European Grand Prix at Monza (to Alberto Ascari), and Czechoslovakian Grand Prix at Brno (to Peter Whitehead in a Ferrari). In addition, he won the Paris Grand Prix at Montlhéry.

Étancelin participated in twelve World Championship Formula One Grands Prix, debuting on 13 May 1950. He scored a total of three championship points. His fifth place in the 1950 Italian Grand Prix made him the oldest driver ever to score championship points, a record set in the very first World Championship season which still stands more than 70 years later.

In 1953, he ran third at the Rouen Grand Prix and at the 12 Hours of Casablanca, and decided to retire. The government of France awarded him the Legion of Honour in recognition of his contribution to the sport of automobile racing that spanned four decades.

Étancelin retained an interest in racing, making occasional appearances in historic racing through 1974.

He died at Neuilly-sur-Seine in 1981.

Major career wins:
Algerian Grand Prix 1930
Grand Prix de la Baule 1929
Grand Prix du Comminges 1929, 1931
Dauphiné Circuit 1930, 1931
French Grand Prix 1930
Grand Prix de Dieppe 1931
Grand Prix de la Marne 1929, 1933
Pau Grand Prix 1930, 1936
Grand Prix de Picardie 1932, 1933
Grand Prix de Reims 1927, 1929
Circuit d'Esterel Plage 1931
24 hours of Le Mans 1934

Racing record

Complete European Championship results
(key) (Races in bold indicate pole position) (Races in italics indicate fastest lap)

Post WWII Grandes Épreuves results
(key) (Races in bold indicate pole position; races in italics indicate fastest lap)

Complete Formula One World Championship results
(key)

 Indicates shared drive with Eugène Chaboud

Complete 24 Hours of Le Mans results

References

1896 births
1981 deaths
Sportspeople from Rouen
French racing drivers
24 Hours of Le Mans drivers
24 Hours of Le Mans winning drivers
French Formula One drivers
Talbot Formula One drivers
Grand Prix drivers
European Championship drivers